Highway 102 (AR 102, Ark. 102, Hwy. 102, and Olrich Street) is a former state highway in Rogers, Arkansas. Between 1985 and 2007, the highway was maintained by the Arkansas State Highway and Transportation Department (AHTD), now known as the Arkansas Department of Transportation (ArDOT).

Route description
The highway began at US 71B in Rogers and ran east as Olrich Street to a poultry plant.

History
Highway 102 was created upon the request of Rogers to provide a state maintained road for an industrial facility in the town in 1985. Rogers mayor Steve Womack requested the highway's maintenance responsibilities be turned over to city jurisdiction, a request granted by the Arkansas State Highway Commission on February 21, 2007.

Major intersections

See also

References

101
Transportation in Benton County, Arkansas
Rogers, Arkansas